Imperiale is a surname. Notable people with the surname include:

Andrés Imperiale (born 1986), Argentine footballer
Anthony Imperiale (1931–1999), American politician
Daniel Imperiale (born 1988), Argentine footballer
Marco Imperiale (born 1999), Italian footballer